Border Breakers is a Danish record company. Acts currently signed to the record label are:
Infernal
Anna David
Bryan Rice
Danseorkestret
Hampenberg
Manzini
Speedtrap
Thomas Barsoe

References

External links
 Official website

Danish record labels
Record labels based in Copenhagen
Companies based in Gentofte Municipality